Mistan (also Romanized as Mīstān) is a village in Jenah Rural District, Jenah District, Bastak County, Hormozgan Province, Iran. At the 2006 census, its population was 156, in 30 families.

References 

Populated places in Bastak County